Gabriele Rossmanith (born in 1956 in Stuttgart) is a German operatic soprano. She is particularly associated with the Hamburg State Opera where she first sang in 1988. Appearances there include the title role in Debussy's Pelléas et Mélisande.

References

External links 

 
 
 Gabriele Rossmanith (Soprano) Bach Cantatas Website
 Gabriele Rossmanith on Discogs
 Gabriele Rossmanith on Operabase
 Was machst du eigentlich tagsüber? Eimsbütteler Nachrichten

1956 births
Living people
Musicians from Stuttgart
German operatic sopranos